The Atlas I was a US expendable launch system manufactured by General Dynamics in the 1990s to launch a variety of satellites. In June 1987, General Dynamics committed $100M to acquire long-lead procurement items to support build of 18 vehicles for sale commercially.

The "I" in "Atlas I" can cause confusion, as all previous Atlas rockets were designated using letters, ending with the Atlas H. However, subsequent rockets were designated using Roman numerals, starting with the Atlas II. Officially, the "I" is the Roman numeral "1". Eleven launches took place, with three failures.

The Atlas I was developed from the Atlas G, and featured many electrical and guidance improvements. Atlas I did not feature any major payload capacity improvements over its predecessor but did offer a larger payload fairing option.

Atlas I would be further developed and improved upon to produce the highly successful Atlas II rocket.

Design
Atlas I was the last use of the classic Atlas design with three engines, a jettisonable booster section, and two vernier engines. While retaining most of those features, Atlas II replaced the verniers with a hydrazine roll control system.

Atlas first stage 
The first stage of the Atlas I was essentially a copy of the first stage of the Atlas G. It featured 2 LR-89-7 booster engines, one LR-105-7 sustainer engine, and 2 LR-101 vernier engines for roll control. The structure of the first stage consisted of stainless steel balloon tanks, much like earlier Atlas rockets. The sustainer and vernier engines were mounted onto this tank structure. The two booster engines, however, were mounted to their own cylindrical skirt structure which attached to the bottom of the tanks. Each LR-89-7 had its own turbopump to feed propellants into the combustion chamber, but the two engines shared a single common gas generator.

The booster engines, along with their support structure and plumbing, would drop away in one piece during flight. As the sustainer engine was more efficient than the booster engines, dropping the booster engines increased the stage's performance. The LR-105-7 sustainer engine and LR-101 vernier engines shut down when all propellant in the first stage tanks was depleted, around four and a half minutes after liftoff. Towards the end of the first stage burn, the payload fairing was jettisoned.

Atlas I featured the same first-stage engines as the Atlas G. They would later be replaced on the Atlas II with better-performing engines derived from the RS-27.

Centaur upper stage 
The upper stage of the Atlas I was the Centaur I stage, derived from earlier models of Centaur that also flew atop Atlas boosters. Centaur I featured two RL-10-A-3A engines burning liquid hydrogen and liquid oxygen, making the stage extremely efficient. To help slow the boiloff of liquid hydrogen in the tanks, Centaur featured fiberglass insulation panels that were jettisoned 25 after the first stage booster engines were jettisoned. Centaur I was the last version of the stage to feature separating insulation panels.

Centaur could be reignited to propel payloads to a geostationary transfer orbit, which was by far the most common flight profile on Atlas I. The maximum coast time of Centaur (essentially the stage's mission lifetime on orbit) was around 90 minutes when the stage was equipped with a long-coast kit. This kit included a larger battery, increased helium storage, additional shielding on the stage, and an extra bottle for hydrazine.

Star 48B third stage 
General Dynamics offered an optional Star 48B third stage for Earth-departure launches. This small solid rocket motor would help give payloads a final push away from Earth shortly after separating from Centaur. Although Star motors flew on other Atlas rockets, they never flew on Atlas I.

Payload fairing  
Two fairing models were available for the Atlas I:

Both fairing models were also offered on the Atlas II series of rockets, and the Large model continues to fly today on the Atlas V.

The payload mass numbers for Atlas I were based on vehicles flying with a -diameter Large fairing. If a vehicle flew using a Medium fairing, the lower mass of the fairing would enable an approximately  increase in payload capacity to a geostationary transfer orbit.

Launch history

See also

Comparison of orbital launchers families
Atlas G
Atlas H
Atlas II
Atlas (rocket family)

References

Atlas (rocket family)